Sproles is a surname. Notable people with the surname include:

Darren Sproles (born 1983), American football player
Victor Sproles (1927–2005), American jazz bassist